This article contains statistics and records related to Nottingham Forest F.C..

Honours

 Football League First Division: 1977–78
 FA Cup: 1897–98, 1958–59
 Football League Cup: 1977–78, 1978–79, 1988–89, 1989–90
 Full Members Cup: 1988–89, 1991–92
 FA Charity Shield: 1978
 European Cup: 1978–79, 1979–80
 European Super Cup: 1979

Source:

Club records
Record win (in all competitions):
14–0, v. Clapton (away), 1st round FA Cup, 17 January 1891

Record Defeat (in all competitions):
1–9, Vs. Blackburn Rovers, Division 2, 10 April 1937

Most league points in one season:
94, Division 1, 1997-1998

Most league goals in one season:
101, Division 3, 1950-1951

Player records
Most appearances for the club (in all competitions, as of 2012):
 Bob McKinlay: 685
 Ian Bowyer: 564
 Steve Chettle: 526
 Stuart Pearce: 522
 John Robertson - 514
 Jack Burkitt - 503 
 Jack Armstrong - 460
 Grenville Morris - 460
  Geoff Thomas – 431
 Viv Anderson - 430

Most goals for the club (in all competitions, as of 2012):
 Grenville Morris: 217
 Nigel Clough: 131
 Wally Ardron: 124
 Johnny Dent: 122
 Ian Storey-Moore - 118

References

Records and Statistics
Nottingham Forest
Forest